Gerda Hasselfeldt (born 7 July 1950) is a German politician of the Christian Social Union (CSU) who served as deputy chairperson of the CDU/CSU parliamentary group and chairwoman of the Bundestag group of CSU parliamentarians. Following her departure from active politics, she became President of the German Red Cross in 2018.

Political career

An economist by training, Hasselfeldt first became a Member of the German Bundestag after the 1987 federal elections. She was appointed Federal Minister for Regional Planning, Building and Urban Development by then-Chancellor Helmut Kohl in a cabinet reshuffle two years later.

From 1991, Hasselfeldt served as Federal Minister for Health. She announced her resignation on 27 April 1992, saying the arrest of her close aide Reinhard Hoppe for allegedly spying for Poland had damaged her health. She was succeeded by Horst Seehofer.

Hasselfeldt was financial policy spokeswoman for the CDU/CSU parliamentary group for seven years. In 2002, she became the first deputy chairwoman of the parliamentary group, under the leadership of chairwoman Angela Merkel. During the 2005 election campaign, she took charge of agriculture, consumer protection and the environment in Merkel’s nine-member shadow cabinet.

After the federal elections in 2005 and 2009, Hasselfeldt was elected Vice President of the German Bundestag. She held this office until she was elected to the head of the Bundestag group of CSU parliamentarians in 2011, succeeding Hans-Peter Friedrich. From 2011 until 2017, she led the group with her co-chair from the CDU, Volker Kauder.

In that capacity, Hasselfeldt was also a member of the parliament's Council of Elders, which – among other duties – determines daily legislative agenda items and assigning committee chairpersons based on party representation. Hasselfeldt also served on the Committee on the Election of Judges, which is in charge of appointing judges to the Federal Constitutional Court of Germany. From 2014, she was also a member of a parliamentary body in charge of appointing judges to the other Highest Courts of Justice, namely the Federal Court of Justice (BGH), the Federal Administrative Court (BVerwG), the Federal Fiscal Court (BFH), the Federal Labour Court (BAG), and the Federal Social Court (BSG).

In the negotiations to form a coalition government following the 2013 federal elections, Hasselfeldt was part of the 15-member leadership circle chaired by Angela Merkel, Horst Seehofer and Sigmar Gabriel.

In April 2016, Hasselfeldt announced that she would not stand in the 2017 federal elections and, instead, resign from active politics by the end of the parliamentary term.

Life after politics
From 2018 until 2019, Hasselfeldt served on the German government's so-called coal commission, which is tasked to develop a masterplan before the end of the year on how to phase-out coal and create a new economic perspective for the country's coal-mining regions. In 2019, she was appointed by Federal Minister for Economic Cooperation and Development Gerd Müller as co-chair (alongside Bärbel Dieckmann) of a commission in charge of drafting recommendations on how to address the causes of displacement and migration.

Political views

Social policy
When members of the Merkel's Christian Democrats in 2012 called on parliament to grant gay couples the same tax benefits as married heterosexuals, Hasselfeldt successfully railed against the idea. "Marriage between a man and a woman must be especially protected because it is fundamentally oriented towards the propagation of life —which isn't the case in homosexual relationships," said Hasselfeldt. In June 2017, she voted against Germany's introduction of same-sex marriage.

In a 2012 letter to Amazon.com CEO Jeff Bezos, Hasselfeldt asked the online retailer to suspend sales of a children's puzzle bearing the image of the crematorium at the Dachau concentration camp, calling the product 'a slap in the face' for Holocaust victims. Just  from the Bavarian capital of Munich, Dachau lies within Hasselfeldt's constituency.

In 2014, Hasselfeldt publicly rejected complaints against her party over its slogan "those who commit fraud will be [kicked] out" - a claim that migrant workers could exploit social welfare.

European policies
A proponent of strict austerity policies during the Eurozone crisis, Hasselfeldt helped organize a majority of German lawmakers to approve a series of measures to assist Greece recover from its government debt crisis. In 2011, she demanded that Italy must do more to convince financial markets of its creditworthiness after a rating downgrade by Standard & Poor's. In 2013, she said Germany was watching France "with a degree of concern" and criticized French President François Hollande for not implementing spending cuts and structural reforms with "sufficient vigor." In a reaction to the European Commission's decision to give France two extra years to cut its deficit in early 2015, Hasselfeldt wrote to the body's president Jean-Claude Juncker in a letter to say that the timing of the decision – coinciding with the euro zone vehemently urging Greece to stick to rules set by the Eurogroup despite significant domestic resistance – "should not create the dangerous impression that we want to apply double standards," and that the same rules needed to apply to all countries whatever their size.

Criticizing Herman Van Rompuy's 2012 road map for a eurozone-wide fiscal policy, Hasselfeldt rejected proposals for a "eurozone fiscal capacity", arguing the idea looked to her like a "transfer union."

In the context of Turkey's largely failed attempted to ban microblogging service Twitter in 2014, Hasselfeldt reaffirmed that "[her] position has always been that Turkey should not be allowed into the EU, and that we are pursuing the principle of privileged partnership." In 2016, Hasselfeldt warned that Britain should not expect to have preferential treatment in case of a Brexit, saying "to me, it is clear: exit means exit. Citizens have to know that with this decision there will be no special treatment for Britain."

NSA surveillance and Edward Snowden
In 2014, Hasselfeldt blocked an opposition bid to bring Edward Snowden to Germany to testify, saying that inviting Snowden to Germany would harm relations with the U.S. and probably force the German government to extradite him to face U.S. espionage charges for unveiling National Security Agency data on surveillance.

Other activities
 German Foundation for Active Citizenship and Volunteering (DSEE), Member of the Board of Trustees (since 2020)
 Deutsches Museum, Member of the Board of Trustees
 Eugen Biser Foundation, Member of the Advisory Board
 Hanns Seidel Foundation, Member of the Board
 Jewish Museum, Berlin, Member of the Board of Trustees
 Federal Academy for Security Policy (BAKS), Member of the Advisory Board (2015-2018)
 Arnold Knoblauch Institute, Chairwoman of the Board of Trustees (2002-2011)
 Federal Financial Supervisory Authority (BaFin), Member of the Administrative Council (1998-2011)

References

External links
 

1950 births
Living people
Female members of the Bundestag
Members of the Bundestag for Bavaria
Federal government ministers of Germany
Health ministers of Germany
Ludwig Maximilian University of Munich alumni
People from Straubing
21st-century German women politicians
Women federal government ministers of Germany
Members of the Bundestag 2013–2017
Members of the Bundestag 2009–2013
Members of the Bundestag 2005–2009
Members of the Bundestag 2002–2005
Members of the Bundestag 1998–2002
Members of the Bundestag 1994–1998
Members of the Bundestag 1990–1994
Members of the Bundestag for the Christian Social Union in Bavaria
20th-century German women